Leeds Male Voice Choir is a choir of men founded in 1916 in Leeds, West Yorkshire in the United Kingdom. Originally formed from mining workers in Middleton, Leeds, the choir now has a diverse of membership of around sixty active members who perform regularly throughout Leeds, Yorkshire and Europe.

The choir aims to Get Men Singing and offers annual singing workshops as part of the choir's charitable aims.

Early years: 1916–1953
Formed by Thomas Crossland, the organist and choirmaster at Stourton Wesleyan Chapel the choir took its name from Broom Pit in Middleton, Leeds and was known for a time as the Broom Excelsior Male Voice performing for the first time in Stourton in September 1916. John Hickes was the conductor until 1953, overseeing the name change to Leeds Male Voice Choir in the late 1940s.

Later years: 1953–2013
John Wheeler took the Director's baton in 1962 with his wife Ursula as the accompanist. He was a principal singer at Leeds Parish Church and was also conductor of Batley Male Voice Choir and Phoenix Park Male Choir in Bradford. Wheeler led the choir and began a series of exchange visits in 1969 with Dortsfeld Male Voice Choir in Dortmund, Leeds' twin city in Germany. The choir developed a concert schedule across Yorkshire and took part in various music festivals across Northern England also performing at the Royal Academy of Music in London.

In 1970, Leeds Male Voice Choir featured as part of the '1000 Voice Choir', accompanied by the Black Dyke Band which was recorded for Stars on Sunday on ITV, the choir also featured on the accompanying album issued in the same year. In 1971 the choir took first place at the Robertshaw Music Festival in Bingley. In 1974 the choir made a TV appearance on Hughie Green's Opportunity Knocks. In 1978 the choirs first album was released featuring some of the traditional male voice repertoire.

Under the direction of Nigel Wears the choir performed in 1988 and 1991 in the ‘Thousand Yorkshire Voices' concerts in The Royal Albert Hall in London. Brass band accompaniment came from both Brighouse and Rastrick Brass Band and Sellers International Band. The choir again returned to the Royal Albert Hall in 1994 whilst directed by David Burnett.

In 2013 led by conductor Will Prideaux the choir hosted the Sing For Heroes concert, gathering men from throughout the city to perform in Leeds Town Hall in aid of the charity Help For Heroes. The concert attracted a variety of new members and helped expand the size and quality of sound of the choir.

Recent years: 2014–present
Following the appointment of Tim Knight, the choir launched a series of themed concerts, performing The Best Of British at Leeds Minster in June 2014. In 2015 the Hollywood Heroes concert played to a sell out audience at Morley Town Hall. returning in March 2019 for Back to Broadway. The choir and lead the city's Festival of Remembrance in November 2018, commemorating one hundred years since the end of the First World War.

In December 2018 Leeds Male Voice Choir performed The Spirit of Christmas at Dewsbury Town Hall.

The choir's divergence from the traditional male voice repertoire resulted in a more internationally themed musical programme.

Leeds Male Voice Choir celebrated one hundred years of singing in Leeds in Leeds Town Hall with Rothwell Temperance Band and The White Rosettes in September 2016, compered by Simon Lindley.

In May 2017 the choir undertook their first international tour in more than 30 years performing across Belgium. Venues included the Menin Gate in Ypres. In May 2019 the choir performed in St. Stephen's Basilica, Budapest as part of a four day tour.

References

External links
 Leeds Male Voice Choir website

1916 establishments in England
Musical groups established in 1916
Yorkshire choirs
Boys' and men's choirs
Musical groups from Leeds